Rinat Sagandykov is a Kazakhstani karateka. He won the gold medal in the men's kumite 67 kg event at the 2010 Asian Games held in Guangzhou, China.

He competed in the men's kumite 65 kg event at the 2006 Asian Games where he was eliminated in his first match by Magid Adwan of Qatar.

He won the silver medal in the men's kumite 67 kg event at the 2014 Asian Games held in Incheon, South Korea.

Achievements

References 

Living people
Year of birth missing (living people)
Place of birth missing (living people)
Kazakhstani male karateka
Karateka at the 2006 Asian Games
Karateka at the 2010 Asian Games
Karateka at the 2014 Asian Games
Asian Games medalists in karate
Asian Games gold medalists for Kazakhstan
Asian Games silver medalists for Kazakhstan
Medalists at the 2010 Asian Games
Medalists at the 2014 Asian Games
Islamic Solidarity Games competitors for Kazakhstan
21st-century Kazakhstani people